Phillip Alan Plantier (born January 27, 1969) is an American former professional baseball player who played in Major League Baseball (MLB) primarily as an outfielder from 1990 to 1997. After his playing career, he spent three seasons as a hitting coach with the San Diego Padres.

Playing career
Plantier was an 11th round draft pick of the Boston Red Sox in the 1987 Major League Baseball Draft. He developed a knack for hitting home runs in the minor leagues and skipped the Double-A level altogether. Plantier first entered the major leagues in  after a midseason call-up from the Pawtucket Red Sox and primarily served as a pinch hitter, but did not play enough for it to be considered his rookie year. In  he was first called up to Boston in June, and played in 11 games, but was sent back down to Pawtucket two weeks later. He was finally called back up to Boston on August 10 and went on a very impressive run over 42 games. In 53 total games and 148 at-bats, he hit 11 home runs and 35 runs batted in (RBIs) while hitting .331, for an average of a home run hit every 13.38 at-bats. As a result, Plantier finished 8th in Rookie of the Year voting.

He enjoyed his best full season in  wherein he hit 34 home runs with 100 RBI, both career highs.

After an injury plagued 1994 season, Plantier was part of an eleven player offseason trade between the Padres and the Houston Astros that brought Ken Caminiti and Steve Finley to San Diego while sending Derek Bell to Houston, among others. He was later traded back to the Padres in July 1995 after roughly half a season with the Astros. Prior to the 1996 season, Plantier signed with the Detroit Tigers, however, during spring training he was traded to the Oakland Athletics for infielder Fausto Cruz and pitcher Ramon Fermin, spending the 1996 season as a reserve outfielder and designated hitter for the A's.

Plantier signed with the San Diego Padres for the 1997 season, his third stint with the team, and later was traded mid-season to the St. Louis Cardinals, where he again spent time as a reserve outfielder and finished out his major league career. Plantier signed as a free agent with Toronto Blue Jays in 1998, but did not appear in any major league games with the club.

Coaching career
In 2007, Plantier was named the manager of the Macon Music of the South Coast League, an independent baseball league that only lasted for that year.
In 2008, Plantier was the hitting coach for the Double-A West Tenn Diamond Jaxx in the Seattle Mariners organization. On January 13, 2009, he was named the manager of the Diamond Jaxx.

In 2010, Plantier was the Minor League Hitting Coordinator for the Seattle Mariners. In 2011, Plantier was named hitting coach, then assigned manager during mid-season for the Lake Elsinore Storm, a Single-A affiliate of the San Diego Padres.

Plantier was named hitting coach of the San Diego Padres on October 31, 2011. He held that position for three seasons; in December 2014, he was replaced by Mark Kotsay.

In 2018, Plantier became the hitting coach of the Scranton/Wilkes-Barre RailRiders, where he spent two seasons.

In August 2019, Plantier was a coach for the United States national baseball team at the 2019 WBSC Premier12 tournament. The team finished in fourth place, missing an opportunity to qualify for the 2020 Olympics via that event.

As of 2021, Plantier is hitting coach for the Jacksonville Jumbo Shrimp, the Marlins' Triple-A affiliate.

References

External links

1969 births
Living people
American expatriate baseball players in Canada
Baseball coaches from New Hampshire
Baseball players from New Hampshire
Boston Red Sox players
Edmonton Trappers players
Elmira Pioneers players
Houston Astros players
Las Vegas Stars (baseball) players
Louisville Redbirds players
Lynchburg Red Sox players
Major League Baseball hitting coaches
Major League Baseball left fielders
Major League Baseball right fielders
Minor league baseball managers
Norfolk Tides players
Oakland Athletics players
Pawtucket Red Sox players
Rancho Cucamonga Quakes players
San Diego Padres coaches
San Diego Padres players
Sportspeople from Manchester, New Hampshire
St. Louis Cardinals players
Tucson Toros players
Winter Haven Red Sox players
Uni-President 7-Eleven Lions coaches